June Green (born 18 January 1959) is a female British former swimmer. Green competed in two events at the 1972 Summer Olympics.

She represented England in the 200, 400 and 800 metres freestyle events, at the 1974 British Commonwealth Games in Christchurch, New Zealand. She won the ASA National Championship title in 1972 and 1973 over 400 metres freestyle and the 1971, 1972 and 1973 800 metres freestyle title.

References

External links
 

1959 births
Living people
British female swimmers
Olympic swimmers of Great Britain
Swimmers at the 1972 Summer Olympics
Swimmers at the 1974 British Commonwealth Games
Place of birth missing (living people)
Commonwealth Games competitors for England
20th-century British women